At least two warships of Germany have been  named Rheinland-Pfalz:

 , a  launched in 1980 and sold for scrapping in 2017
 , a  launched in 2017

German Navy ship names